The Next Top Bang is an original Chinese reality variety show produced by Dragon Television. It was first aired on 21 October 2018.

Concept 
The Next Top Bang brings together 108 trainees from 13,699 auditionees. Out of the 108 trainees, they are split according to their genders, and to compete for their debut.

Mentors
The mentor teams are William, G.E.M. and Haiquan for male and Kris, Victoria and Bibi for female.

Contestants

Female

Male

Round 1 : Selections

In this round, contestants first danced inside individual 'lifts' on stage in groups of 3. Only those who did not get 2 or more 'red arrows' by the mentors get the chance to exit the lift and sing a song of their choice. Contestants who managed to get all 3 'green arrows' from the mentors after singing will then successfully join the team.

Once all 7 seats in the group have been filled, further contestants who get 3 'green arrows' will have to replace an existing contestant, either by the mentors' decision or by audience voting if the mentors cannot reach a unanimous decision.

Throughout the show, each mentor has one single chance to use a 'golden button' to retain any contestant within the team.

Episode 1 (broadcast date : 21 October 2018)

Episode 2 (broadcast date : 28 October 2018)

Zhou Liyang and Liu Qianyu were eliminated in this episode as the Female team has exceeded 7 members.

Episode 3 (broadcast date : 4 November 2018)

Li Jiajie was eliminated in this episode as the Male team has exceeded 7 members.
Xu Yiyang, Jiang Dan and Chen Jiaxin were eliminated in this episode as the Female team has exceeded 7 members.
Shi Jiapeng was accepted as the 8th member of the Male team by mentor William Chan's golden button.

Episode 4 (broadcast date : 11 November 2018)

Heer Lijun and Raymond were eliminated in this episode as the Male team has exceeded 8 members.
Xiao Wu and He Xingyu were eliminated in this episode as the Female team has exceeded 7 members.

Episode 5 (broadcast date : 18 November 2018)

Zuo Qibo and Shi Jiapeng were eliminated in this episode as the Male team has exceeded 7 members.
Hou Jinrao was accepted as the 8th member of the Male team by mentor G.E.M.'s golden button.
Xu Ziyin, Yu Ziyan and Zhu Kejia were eliminated in this episode as the Female team has exceeded 7 members.

Episode 6 (broadcast date : 25 November 2018)

 Ni Qiuyun and Wang Zhiyan were accepted as the 8th and 9th member of the Female team by mentors Victoria Song's and Kris Wu's golden buttons respectively.
 He Kailun was eliminated in this episode as the Male team has exceeded 7 members. 
 Ni Qiuyun, Jiang Yu, Qu Xue and Xu Xinwen were eliminated in this episode as the Female team has exceeded 7 members.

Round 2 : Eliminations

In this round, the male and female teams battle against each other with 3 performances in each episode. The losing team will then have one member from their team in the elimination stand, who will potentially be replaced by a substitute member.

Episode 7 (broadcast date : 2 December 2018)

Joey Yung was invited as a guest mentor for the male team due to G.E.M.'s scheduling issues.

As the Male team won 12 points vs 9 points in this episode, Wang Zhiyan 王芷嫣 from the female team was selected to stand in the elimination stand. Liu Danmeng 劉丹萌 was selected to replace Wang Zhiyan 王芷嫣 as a contesting member.
Hu Xiaoling 胡潇灵 was selected as the substitute member for the Male Team, while Liu Danmeng 劉丹萌 and Xu Yiyang 徐艺洋 for the Female Team.

Episode 8 (broadcast date : 9 December 2018)

Zhao Yingjun was invited as a guest mentor for the male team due to Hu Haiquan's scheduling issues.

As the Male team won again with 12 points vs 9 points in this episode, Wang Zhiyan 王芷嫣 from the Female team was selected as the member from the team to be eliminated. For the next episode, Xu Yiyang 徐艺洋 was selected to replace Zhou Xue as a contesting member.

Episode 9 (broadcast date : 16 December 2018)

 As the Male team won again in this episode, Zhou Xue 周雪 was selected as the member from the female team to be eliminated.

Episode 10 (broadcast date : 23 December 2018)

Zheng Kai was invited as a guest mentor for the female team due to Kris Wu's scheduling issues.

 As the Male team won again in this episode, Xiao Xianer 小仙兒 was selected as the member from the female team to be eliminated.

Episode 11 (broadcast date : 30 December 2018)

Zheng Kai and Tia Ray were invited as a guest mentors for the female team due to Kris Wu's  and Victoria Song's scheduling issues.

 As the Female team won for the first time in this episode, Luo Jie 羅杰 was selected to stand in elimination stand. Hu Xiaoling 胡潇灵 was selected to replace Luo Jie 羅杰 as a contesting member.

Final Round

Episode 12 (broadcast date : 6 January 2019)

As the Male Team won in this final round, one of its members gets to be the MVP of the year. Yang Haoming 楊昊銘 was eventually voted to be the MVP of the year, beating second placed Wang Guangyun 王廣允 and third placed Hou Jinyao 侯锦尧.

Teams

Round Two

Notes

References

Chinese music television series
Mandopop
2018 Chinese television series debuts
Chinese television shows
Mandarin-language television shows
2019 Chinese television series endings